Cumnoria is a genus of herbivorous iguanodontian dinosaur. It was a basal iguanodontian that lived during the Late Jurassic period (Kimmeridgian age) in what is now Oxfordshire, United Kingdom.

Description
The holotype of Cumnoria is of a rather small bipedal animal with a slender build. about 3.5 metres (11.4 feet) long, The specimen is probably that of a juvenile though.

History of discovery
Cumnoria is known from the holotype OXFUM J.3303, a partial skull and postcranium, recovered from the lower Kimmeridge Clay Formation, in the Chawley Brick Pits, Cumnor Hurst. Workers at first discarded the remains on a dump heap, but one of them later collected the bones in a sack and showed them to Professor George Rolleston, an anatomist at the nearby Oxford University. Rolleston in turn brought them to the attention of palaeontologist Professor Joseph Prestwich who in 1879 reported them as a new species of Iguanodon, though without actually coining a species name. In 1880 Prestwich published an article on the geological stratigraphy of the find. The same year John Whitaker Hulke named the species Iguanodon prestwichii, the specific epithet honouring Prestwich.

In 1888, Harry Govier Seeley decided the taxon represented a new and separate genus which he named Cumnoria after Cumnor, the village where it was discovered. Its type species Iguanodon prestwichii was thus recombined into Cumnoria prestwichii — though Seeley spelled the epithet as prestwichi. The genus was quickly abandoned however: already in 1889 Richard Lydekker assigned the species to Camptosaurus, as Camptosaurus prestwichii. This opinion was generally accepted for over a century. In 1980 Peter Galton provided the first modern description of the species.

In 1998 David Norman concluded that Seeley's original generic distinction was valid. In 2008 this was supported by Darren Naish and David Martill. In 2010 and 2011 cladistic analyses by Andrew T. McDonald confirmed this by showing that Cumnoria had a separate phylogenetic position from Camptosaurus dispar. However, in 2015, Uteodon and Cumnoria were synonymized with Camptosaurus, but as distinct species. Maidment et al. (2023) also considered Cumnoria to be distinct from Camptosaurus.

Classification
Camptosaurus prestwichii was traditionally assigned to the Camptosauridae. In the new analyses of McDonald Cumnoria has instead been recovered as a basal member of the Styracosterna, more closely related to more derived ("advanced") iguanodontians than to Camptosaurus dispar. Cumnoria would then be the oldest known styracostern.

Maidment et al. (2023) instead recovered Cumnoria as a non-ankylopollexian iguanodontian.

References

Iguanodonts
Kimmeridgian life
Late Jurassic dinosaurs of Europe
Jurassic England
Fossils of England
Fossil taxa described in 1888
Taxa named by Harry Seeley
Ornithischian genera